Botakara, known as "Ulyanovsk" until 1997, is a settlement in Karaganda Region, Kazakhstan. It is the capital of Bukhar-Zhyrau District and the administrative center of the Botakara rural district (KATO code - 354030100). Population:

Archaeology

Geography 
Botakara lies in the Kazakh Uplands by the banks of the Nura river. Lake Botakara is located to the north. The Karaganda — Karkaralinsk highway and the Karaganda — Karagaily railway pass through the village.

References

External links
History of Kazakhstan (in Russian)

Populated places in Karaganda Region

kk:Ботақара (кент, Ботақара кенттік әкімдігі)
ru:Ботакара